The Sepetiba Formation is a geological formation of the Santos Basin offshore of the Brazilian states of Rio de Janeiro, São Paulo, Paraná and Santa Catarina. The formation is the uppermost unit of the Santos Basin.

Etymology 
The formation is named after Sepetiba, a neighbourhood of Rio de Janeiro.

Description 
The Sepetiba Formation is the uppermost formation of the Santos Basin stratigraphy. The formation consists of whitish grey fine to coarse grained carbonitic sands. They are feldspar-rich, glauconitic coquinas consisting of bivalve fragments and foraminifera. The depositional environment is thought to be coastal.

See also 

 Campos Basin

References

Bibliography 
 
 

Geologic formations of Brazil
Santos Basin
Pleistocene Brazil
Holocene Brazil
Limestone formations
Shallow marine deposits
Formations
Formations
Formations
Formations
Tupi–Guarani languages